Spell My Name is the ninth studio album by American singer Toni Braxton. It was released by Island Records on August 28, 2020. Her debut with the record label, following a short-lived stint with Def Jam Recordings on her eighth album Sex & Cigarettes (2018), Braxton assumed more control on Spell My Name, again taking a greater hand in writing and producing the material. Her collaborations included frequent collaborators Paul Boutin, Antonio Dixon, and Babyface as well as singers and songwriters Patrick "J. Que" Smith, Chris Braide, Dapo Torimiro, Soundz, H.E.R. and Missy Elliott.

The album received generally positive reviews by music critics who complimented its production standards but criticized its length and the preponderance of balladry on the album. On the charts, Spell My Name failed to repeat the success of Sex & Cigarettes, becoming her lowest-charting yet with a peak at number 163 on the US Billboard 200. Its release was preceded by the singles "Do It" and "Dance," the former of which peaked at number one on the US Adult R&B Songs, and followed by "Gotta Move On," Braxtons's eleventh topper on the chart.

Background
Braxton began work on her tenth studio album several months after the release of her Grammy Award-nominated previous project Sex & Cigarettes (2018). Making the album, which Braxton cited as the most fun she has had in years,
 she reteamed with longtime contributors such as Antonio Dixon and Babyface but also consulted new collaborators to work with her, including Soundz, Patrick "J. Que" Smith, Ghara "PK" Degeddingseze, Chris Braide, and Dapo Torimiro. Her team also reached out to rapper Missy Elliott who produced on and recorded additional vocals for a remix version of "Do It." The remix, along with the original version, also appears on the final track listing.

As with her previous two albums, Braxton assumed more control, again taking a greater hand in writing the material, while also producing some of the records herself. While 85 per cent of Spell My Name was completed before the rise of the COVID-19 pandemic, the singer was forced to complete several songs in the closet. When asked about what was it like working during quarantine, she elaborated: "It wasn't that difficult for me because most of my album was done. It was just about putting it together, deciding the sequence, the order, mixing and mastering." Braxton would select songs in her car, listening to them while driving around, a process she described as "the best thing because you can hear the songs on the radio and then play your songs right after hear how it sounds."

The album was named after the same-titled album track which is about an older woman being with a younger guy. According to Braxton, it acknowledges her legendary status: "I have been in the music business a long time. So I think it’s OK for me to be confident in myself and the album title refers to that, like ‘Spell my name, I’m Toni Braxton — T.O.N.I B.R.A.X.T.O.N’ [...] I've been in this business for a long time and I've been blessed, so, put some respect on my name a little bit [...] I just thought it was a cool title to be honest."

Singles
"Do It" was released as the album's first single on April 6, 2020, also serving as Braxton's debut with Island Records. It peaked at number 1 on the US Adult R&B Songs chart. On June 26, 2020, Island released a remix version of "Do It" featuring additional vocals and new production from Elliott. On May 15, 2020, Dave Audé's remix of second single "Dance" was released. The album version of the track was released on July 31, 2020, with the accompanying music video being released on August 5, 2020. In support of the album, "Gotta Move On" featuring singer H.E.R. was released to Braxton's YouTube account on August 24, 2020. It peaked at number 1 on the US Adult R&B Songs chart.

Critical reception

Spell My Name received generally positive reviews from music critics. At Metacritic, which assigns a normalized rating out of 100 to reviews from mainstream critics, the album received an average score of 71, which indicates "generally favorable reviews," based on four reviews. Kemi Alemoru, writing for The Guardian, called the album "a full-bodied record that exhibits Braxton’s stylistic and vocal range." She found that "Braxton – once an R&B trailblazer – is still hungry to be a part of the genre’s resurgence [and] hasn’t lost her broad vocal range or her ability to slot into multiple mood playlists. It has everything you want from a full-bodied R&B record: songs to cry to, vibe to, and make babies to."

In his review for Variety, Jeff Vashista named Spell My Name "possibly her strongest album since her halcyon period in the mid-to-late ‘90’s [...] Braxton co-wrote nearly every song on the album, and she and her collaborators have succeeded in deftly meshing her signature minor-key R&B sound with production and vocal arrangements that keep things classy but contemporary [...] This is a not an R&B record made on a bedroom laptop: It’s expensive sounding, with a stellar cast of collaborators and dramatic orchestrations." Idolators Mike Wass found that Spell My Name "is particularly successful when Toni plays to her strengths – namely old-school soul and silky smooth ballads [but] is less successful, however, when [she] tries to up the tempo." He remarked however, that "ultimately, these missteps do little to diminish the pleasure of Spell My Name."

Allmusic editor Andy Kellman found that Braxton spends most of "the set succumbing to desire recognized as ill-fated, mourning unfulfillment, waving off a cheating ex, and swearing during the emotional peak [...] The material tends toward routine, but Braxton's elegant distress cuts through everything with conviction." Robin Murray from Clash was critical with the "preponderance of slo-mo balladry" on the album, writing that the album "is hard to fault, then, but also difficult to truly love [...] It’s far from a failure, with Spell My Name boasting moments of rich maturity, the kind of lyrical openness that has always made her work so intriguing. Yet there’s also an unwillingness to embrace contemporary movements in R&B." musicOMH writer Ben Devlin called Spell My Name "a veritable pot luck of styles, some of which work [...] The album is brief, almost EP length, and doesn’t end nearly as well as it begins, but Spell My Name still features some great tunes."

Chart performance
The album debuted at number 163 on the US Billboard 200, as well as number 21 on the Top R&B Albums in the week ending September 12, 2020. This marked Braxton's lowest-charting debut since her 2001 Christmas album Snowflakes which peaked at number 119.

Track listing

Notes
 denotes producer and vocal producer
 denotes vocal producer only
 denotes additional producer

Personnel and credits 
Adapted from album booklet.

Recording locations 
Brandon's Way Recording Studios (Los Angeles, California)
East West Studios (Los Angeles, California)
Mass Confusion Studios (Los Angeles, California)
PM Mastering (New Jersey)

Personnel 
Musicians

Toni Braxton – vocals
Missy Elliott – featured artist 
H.E.R. – featured artist , guitar solo 
Babyface – electric guitars 
Percy Bady – programming , keyboards 
Paul Boutin – percussions 
Chris Braide – bass , keys , guitar 
Ghara "PK" Degeddingseze – keys , strings 
Antonio Dixon – programming , bass , keyboards , horns arrangement 
Raymon "Big Play Ray" Holten – guitar , bass 
Pete Johnson – strings 
Hannon Lane – programming , guitar , bass , keyboards , drums , percussion 
Jordon Manswell – drums , percussion , beatbox vocals 
Jonathan Martin – keyboards 
Sammy Perez – guitar 
Demonte Posey – strings arrangement , horns arrangement , programming , drums , keyboards programming 
Dapo Torimiro – bass 
Eric Walls – guitar 
Benjamin Wright – strings arrangement 
Johnny Yukon – additional vocals 

Technical

Toni Braxton – executive production, production , vocal production 
Babyface – production 
Darcus Beese – executive production
Paul Boutin – co-executive production, vocal production , mixing , engineering , vocals recording , recording 
Chris Braide – production 
Ghara "PK" Degeddingseze – production 
Antonio Dixon – production 
Reggie Dozier – strings recording 
Missy Elliott – production , additional engineering , mixing , remixing 
Akeel Henry – production 
K Y – additional engineering , mixing 
Hannon Lane – co-production , recording , remixing 
Jordon Manswell – production 
Jonathan Martin – production 
Herb Powers, Jr. – mastering
Soundz – production , engineering 
Dapo Torimiro – production 

Design

Sandra Brummels – creative direction
Vol S. Davis III – business affairs
Paul Lane – package production
Miller Mobley – photography
Ashley Pawlak – art direction

Charts

Release history

References

2020 albums
Island Records albums
Toni Braxton albums
Albums produced by Babyface (musician)
Albums produced by Missy Elliott